Cheshna Sar (also Romanized as Cheshnā Sar and Cheshnāsar) is a village in Deylaman Rural District, Deylaman District, Siahkal County, Gilan Province, Iran. At the 2006 census, its population was 56, in 15 families.

References 

Populated places in Siahkal County